The Bradshaw Field Training Area (BFTA) is a large area in the Northern Territory used for training by the Australian Army as well as an Australia-US Joint Combined Training Centre. The training area is a former cattle station, Bradshaw Station, which was purchased by the Australian Government for military training in 1996. It occupies approximately 870,000 hectares, starting 500 metres north of the settlement of Timber Creek. A large dirt airstrip capable of operating C-17 Globemaster transport aircraft was built by Australian Defence Force and United States Military engineers at BFTA in less than four weeks during Exercise Talisman Sabre in 2007.

Notes

References

 

Australian Army bases
Military installations in the Northern Territory